Alanopine dehydrogenase is an enzyme that catalyzes the chemical reaction

2,2'-iminodipropanoate + NAD+ + H2O  L-alanine + pyruvate + NADH + H+

The 2 substrates of this enzyme are 2,2'-iminodipropanoate, and nicotinamide adenine dinucleotide+. water is excluded since water is 55M and does not change. Its 4 products are L-alanine, pyruvate, nicotinamide adenine dinucleotide, and hydrogen ion.

This enzyme belongs to the family of oxidoreductases, specifically those acting on the CH-NH group of donors with NAD+ or NADP+ as acceptor.  The systematic name of this enzyme class is 2,2'-iminodipropanoate:NAD+ oxidoreductase (L-alanine-forming). Other names in common use include ALPDH, alanopine[meso-N-(1-carboxyethyl)-alanine]dehydrogenase, meso-N-(1-carboxyethyl)-alanine:NAD+ oxidoreductase, alanopine: NAD+ oxidoreductase, ADH, and alanopine:NAD+ oxidoreductase.

References

 
 
 

EC 1.5.1
NADH-dependent enzymes
Enzymes of unknown structure